It Is Curtains is the first EP by American post rock band Beware of Safety.  It was released in 2007.

Track listing
"Kaura" - 5:19
"Weak Wrists" - 6:56	
"The Difference Between Wind and Rain" - 6:25
"Veneklasen" - 2:20
"O'Canada" - 6:26
"To the Roof!  Let's Jump and Fall" - 10:24

Personnel
 Steve Molter – guitar
 Adam Kay – guitar
 Jeff Zemina – guitar
 Morgan Hendry – drums

Release details
 2007, US, The Mylene Sheath, release date 2007, CD

External links
 The Band's MySpace Page
 The Mylene Sheath
 ProgArchives

2007 debut EPs
Post-rock EPs
Beware of Safety albums